In mathematics, a paracompact space is a topological space in which every open cover has an open refinement that is locally finite. Every compact space is paracompact. Every paracompact Hausdorff space is normal, and a Hausdorff space is paracompact if and only if it admits partitions of unity subordinate to any open cover. Sometimes paracompact spaces are defined so as to always be Hausdorff.

Every closed subspace of a paracompact space is paracompact. While compact subsets of Hausdorff spaces are always closed, this is not true for paracompact subsets. A space such that every subspace of it is a paracompact space is called hereditarily paracompact. This is equivalent to requiring that every open subspace be paracompact.

The notion of paracompact space is also studied in pointless topology, where it is more well-behaved. For example, the product of any number of paracompact locales is a paracompact locale, but the product of two paracompact spaces may not be paracompact.  Compare this to Tychonoff's theorem, which states that the product of any collection of compact topological spaces is compact. However, the product of a paracompact space and a compact space is always paracompact.

Every metric space is paracompact. A topological space is metrizable if and only if it is a paracompact and locally metrizable Hausdorff space.

Definition 

A cover of a set  is a collection of subsets of  whose union contains .

 

A cover of a topological space  is open if all its members are open sets. A refinement of a cover of a space  is a new cover of the same space such that every set in the new cover is a subset of some set in the old cover.

An open cover of a space  is locally finite if every point of the space has a neighborhood that intersects only finitely many sets in the cover.

 

is finite. A topological space  is now said to be paracompact if every open cover has a locally finite open refinement.

Note that an open cover on a topological space is locally finite iff its a locally finite cover of the underlying locale.

Examples 

 Every compact space is paracompact.
 Every regular Lindelöf space is paracompact. In particular, every locally compact Hausdorff second-countable space is paracompact.
 The Sorgenfrey line is paracompact, even though it is neither compact, locally compact, second countable, nor metrizable.
 Every CW complex is paracompact.
 (Theorem of A. H. Stone) Every metric space is paracompact.  Early proofs were somewhat involved, but an elementary one was found by M. E. Rudin.  Existing proofs of this require the axiom of choice for the non-separable case.  It has been shown that ZF theory is not sufficient to prove it, even after the weaker axiom of dependent choice is added.

Some examples of spaces that are not paracompact include:

 The most famous counterexample is the long line, which is a nonparacompact topological manifold. (The long line is locally compact, but not second countable.)
 Another counterexample is a product of uncountably many copies of an infinite discrete space. Any infinite set carrying the particular point topology is not paracompact; in fact it is not even metacompact.
 The Prüfer manifold is a non-paracompact surface.
 The bagpipe theorem shows that there are 2ℵ1 isomorphism classes of non-paracompact surfaces.
 The Sorgenfrey plane is not paracompact despite being a product of two paracompact spaces.

Properties 

Paracompactness is weakly hereditary, i.e. every closed subspace of a paracompact space is paracompact. This can be extended to F-sigma subspaces as well.

 A regular space is paracompact if every open cover admits a locally finite refinement. (Here, the refinement is not required to be open.) In particular, every regular Lindelöf space is paracompact.
 (Smirnov metrization theorem) A topological space is metrizable if and only if it is paracompact, Hausdorff, and locally metrizable.
 Michael selection theorem states that lower semicontinuous multifunctions from X into nonempty closed convex subsets of Banach spaces admit continuous selection iff X is paracompact.

Although a product of paracompact spaces need not be paracompact, the following are true:

 The product of a paracompact space and a compact space is paracompact.
 The product of a metacompact space and a compact space is metacompact.

Both these results can be proved by the tube lemma which is used in the proof that a product of finitely many compact spaces is compact.

Paracompact Hausdorff spaces 

Paracompact spaces are sometimes required to also be Hausdorff to extend their properties.

 (Theorem of Jean Dieudonné) Every paracompact Hausdorff space is normal.
 Every paracompact Hausdorff space is a shrinking space, that is, every open cover of a paracompact Hausdorff space has a shrinking: another open cover indexed by the same set such that the closure of every set in the new cover lies inside the corresponding set in the old cover.
 On paracompact Hausdorff spaces, sheaf cohomology and Čech cohomology are equal.

Partitions of unity 

The most important feature of paracompact Hausdorff spaces is that they are normal and admit partitions of unity subordinate to any open cover. This means the following: if X is a paracompact Hausdorff space with a given open cover, then there exists a collection of continuous functions on X with values in the unit interval [0, 1] such that:

 for every function f: X → R from the collection, there is an open set U from the cover such that the support of f is contained in U;
 for every point x in X, there is a neighborhood V of x such that all but finitely many of the functions in the collection are identically 0 in V and the sum of the nonzero functions is identically 1 in V.

In fact, a T1 space is Hausdorff and paracompact if and only if it admits partitions of unity subordinate to any open cover (see below). This property is sometimes used to define paracompact spaces (at least in the Hausdorff case).

Partitions of unity are useful because they often allow one to extend local constructions to the whole space. For instance, the integral of differential forms on paracompact manifolds is first defined locally (where the manifold looks like Euclidean space and the integral is well known), and this definition is then extended to the whole space via a partition of unity.

Proof that paracompact Hausdorff spaces admit partitions of unity

Relationship with compactness 

There is a similarity between the definitions of compactness and paracompactness:
For paracompactness, "subcover" is replaced by "open refinement" and "finite" by is replaced by "locally finite". Both of these changes are significant: if we take the definition of paracompact and change "open refinement" back to "subcover", or "locally finite" back to "finite", we end up with the compact spaces in both cases.

Paracompactness has little to do with the notion of compactness, but rather more to do with breaking up topological space entities into manageable pieces.

Comparison of properties with compactness 

Paracompactness is similar to compactness in the following respects:

 Every closed subset of a paracompact space is paracompact.
 Every paracompact Hausdorff space is normal.

It is different in these respects:

 A paracompact subset of a Hausdorff space need not be closed. In fact, for metric spaces, all subsets are paracompact.
 A product of paracompact spaces need not be paracompact. The square of the real line R in the lower limit topology is a classical example for this.

Variations 

There are several variations of the notion of paracompactness. To define them, we first need to extend the list of terms above:

A topological space is:

 metacompact if every open cover has an open pointwise finite refinement.
 orthocompact if every open cover has an open refinement such that the intersection of all the open sets about any point in this refinement is open.
 fully normal if every open cover has an open star refinement, and fully T4 if it is fully normal and T1 (see separation axioms).

The adverb "countably" can be added to any of the adjectives "paracompact", "metacompact", and "fully normal" to make the requirement apply only to countable open covers.

Every paracompact space is metacompact, and every metacompact space is orthocompact.

Definition of relevant terms for the variations 

 Given a cover and a point, the star of the point in the cover is the union of all the sets in the cover that contain the point. In symbols, the star of x in U = {Uα : α in A} is

 

 The notation for the star is not standardised in the literature, and this is just one possibility.
 A star refinement of a cover of a space X is a new cover of the same space such that, given any point in the space, the star of the point in the new cover is a subset of some set in the old cover. In symbols, V is a star refinement of U = {Uα : α in A} if and only if, for any x in X, there exists a Uα in U, such that V*(x) is contained in Uα.
 A cover of a space X is pointwise finite if every point of the space belongs to only finitely many sets in the cover. In symbols, U is pointwise finite if and only if, for any x in X, the set  is finite.

As the name implies, a fully normal space is normal. Every fully T4 space is paracompact. In fact, for Hausdorff spaces, paracompactness and full normality are equivalent. Thus, a fully T4 space is the same thing as a paracompact Hausdorff space.

Without the Hausdorff property, paracompact spaces are not necessarily fully normal.  Any compact space that is not regular provides an example.

A historical note: fully normal spaces were defined before paracompact spaces, in 1940, by John W. Tukey. 
The proof that all metrizable spaces are fully normal is easy. When it was proved by A.H. Stone that for Hausdorff spaces full normality and paracompactness are equivalent, he implicitly proved that all metrizable spaces are paracompact. Later Ernest Michael 
gave a direct proof of the latter fact and
M.E. Rudin gave another, elementary, proof.

See also 

 a-paracompact space
 Paranormal space

Notes

References 

 
 Lynn Arthur Steen and J. Arthur Seebach, Jr., Counterexamples in Topology (2 ed), Springer Verlag, 1978, .  P.23.

External links 

 

Separation axioms
Compactness (mathematics)
Properties of topological spaces